Murilo Vinicius Leite Cadina (born 27 January 1997) is a Brazilian footballer who plays as a defensive midfielder for Spanish club CD Manchego Ciudad Real.

Club career
Born in Sorocaba, São Paulo, Cadina started his career with Santos' youth setup. On 11 March 2016, he signed a two-year deal with Palmeiras. After spending nearly two years in Palmeiras' under-20 squad, Cadina was announced at Barretos on 28 February 2018. However, he only featured once as an unused substitute before leaving the club.

On 20 February 2019, Cadina moved abroad and signed a four-year contract with FC Lviv. He made his Ukrainian Premier League debut three days later, in a game against FC Chornomorets Odesa. He eventually terminated his contract with the club in the summer of 2019, in order to sign a three-year deal with Greek Super League 2 side Ergotelis in July 2019. His contract was however terminated during pre-season.

References

External links
 
 

1997 births
People from Sorocaba
Living people
Brazilian footballers
Association football midfielders
Barretos Esporte Clube players
Ukrainian Premier League players
Ergotelis F.C. players
FC Lviv players
Tercera Federación players
CD Manchego Ciudad Real players
Brazilian expatriate footballers
Brazilian expatriate sportspeople in Ukraine
Brazilian expatriate sportspeople in Greece
Brazilian expatriate sportspeople in Spain
Expatriate footballers in Ukraine
Expatriate footballers in Greece
Expatriate footballers in Spain
Footballers from São Paulo (state)